The Lambart Baronetcy, of Beau Parc in the County of Meath, was a title in the Baronetage of the United Kingdom. It was created on 13 July 1911 for Gustavus Lambart, the former Comptroller and Chamberlain to the Lord-Lieutenant of Ireland. The title became extinct on the death of his son, the second Baronet, in 1986.

The first Baronet was a descendant of the Hon. Oliver Lambart, member of the Irish House of Commons for Kilbeggan and younger son of Charles Lambart, 1st Earl of Cavan (see Earl of Cavan). Oliver's son Charles Lambart, grandson Gustavus Lambart, great-grandson Charles Lambart, and great-great-grandson Gustavus Lambart, were all members of the Irish Parliament for Kilbeggan. The latter was the father of Gustavus William Lambart (1814–1886), State Steward to the Lord-Lieutenant of Ireland and father of the first Baronet.

Lambart baronets, of Beau Parc (1911)
Sir Gustavus Francis Lambart, 1st Baronet (1848–1926)
Sir Oliver Francis Lambart, 2nd Baronet (1913–1986)

See also
Earl of Cavan

References

Extinct baronetcies in the Baronetage of the United Kingdom